Gloria is the first Christmas album from Canadian pop punk band Hawk Nelson. It was released on November 21, 2006.

Track listing 
 "Alleluia"
 "Gloria"
 "I Heard the Bells"

Personnel
 Jason Dunn – vocals, keyboards
 Daniel Biro – bass guitar, background vocals
 Jonathan Steingard – guitar, background vocals
 Aaron Tosti – drums

Hawk Nelson albums
2006 EPs
2006 Christmas albums
Christmas albums by Canadian artists